Egerton Street School is in Chester, Cheshire, England, and has fronts on Egerton Street, Albert Street and Crewe Street.  It is recorded in the National Heritage List for England as a designated Grade listed building.

Today the building is used a private nursery school.

History
The school was designed jointly by John Douglas and W. T. Lockwood (son of Thomas Lockwood) for Chester City Council and built in 1909–10.  Douglas' biographer Edward Hubbard comments that "the joint authorship is clearly obvious".

Architecture
The school is constructed in red brick with yellow terracotta dressings and it has a brown tile roof.  It is in one or two storeys and has three shaped gables.

See also

Grade II listed buildings in Chester (north and west)
List of non-ecclesiastical and non-residential works by John Douglas

References

External links
Little Friends Nursery at the former school site

Egerton Street School
Grade II listed buildings in Chester
John Douglas buildings
School buildings completed in 1910
Defunct schools in Cheshire West and Chester